James Snowden may refer to:

 James Ross Snowden (1809–1878), treasurer and director of the United States Mint
 J. Keighley Snowden (1860–1947), author